Bled Castle is a medieval castle built on a precipice above the city of Bled in Slovenia, overlooking Lake Bled. According to written sources, it is the oldest Slovenian castle and is currently one of the most visited tourist attractions in Slovenia. Nowadays, the castle is employed as a historical museum with a collection that represents the lake's history.

History and structures
The castle was first mentioned in a 22 May 1011 deed of donation issued by Emperor Henry II in favour of the Bishops of Brixen, and it was their residence for eight centuries. Then located in the March of Carniola of the Holy Roman Empire, it later passed to the Austrian House of Habsburg in 1278.

The oldest part of the castle is the Romanesque tower. In the Middle Ages more towers were built and the fortifications were improved. Other buildings were constructed in the Renaissance style. The buildings are arranged around two courtyards, which are connected with a staircase. There is a chapel in the upper courtyard, which was built in the 16th century and renovated around 1700, when it was also painted with illusionist frescoes. The castle also has a drawbridge over a moat.

Gallery

References

External links

 Bled Castle. Bled Cultural Institute.
 Virtual panoramas. Bled Castle.

Castles in Upper Carniola
Castle
Cultural monuments of Slovenia